Atelozomyia is a genus of horse flies in the family Tabanidae.

Distribution
Namibia.

Species
Atelozomyia thalassae Dias, 1987

References

Tabanidae
Brachycera genera
Diptera of Africa